Franjo Komarica (born 3 February 1946) is a Bosnian prelate of the Catholic Church, the Bishop of Banja Luka since 1989.

Early life
One of eleven children, Komarica was born in Novakovići near Banja Luka, Bosnia and Herzegovina, to Ivka and Ivo Komarica. He finished elementary school in Banja Luka, then he attended the minor seminary in Zagreb (1961–63) and Đakovo (1963–65). After completing his compulsory military service he began theological studies in Ðakovo (1967–68), and continued studying at the Faculty of Catholic Theology of the University of Innsbruck (1968–72).

Priesthood
Komarica was ordained to the priesthood by Alfred Pichler on June 29, 1972 in Mariastern Abbey, near Banja Luka, and then continued special studies in Innsbruck, where he earned master's degree in 1973, and doctorate in liturgy in 1978.

Episcopal ministry
On 28 October 1985, Komarica was appointed Auxiliary Bishop of Banja Luka and Titular Bishop of Satafis in Africa by Pope John Paul II. He received his episcopal consecration from John Paul II, with Agostino Casaroli and Bernardin Gantin serving as co-consecrators on 6 January 1986. Until the retirement of Bishop Alfred Pichler Komarica served as Bishop's Vicar General. On 15 May 1989, he was appointed Bishop of Banja Luka and two months later, officially took the office.

Role during the Bosnian war
Just a few years after he took the office whole Bosnia and Herzegovina and particular the Diocese of Banja Luka faced with armed aggression. During the Bosnian war, Bishop Komarica's diocese fell under Serbian control. Over 220,000 Roman Catholics were forced to flee the area now known as Republika Srpska, at least 400 were killed, including seven priests and nun. In the Diocese of Banja Luka, 98% of churches and a third of other Church property was destroyed in the war. "It is an ethnocide, or genocide", the bishop said in 1996, "because the presence of a nation, its culture and religion is being wiped out. All the recognisable signs of our existence are being destroyed: churches, monasteries, graveyards, monuments, names, ..."

During the war, although under house arrest and could not move around, the Bishop reportedly tried to keep in contact with his diocese, sending out priests to bring him information from the various parishes while endeavouring to make contact with Bosnian Serbian officials. During and after the war, Komarica reportedly gave hospitality in his own residence to displaced Muslim, Orthodox and Catholic families, numbering more than 30 people at a time.

After the war

After the Yugoslav wars, Komarica remained a supporter of preserving Croatian and Roman Catholic traditions in Bosnia and Herzegovina.
In 2004 he was nominated as a candidate for the Nobel Peace Prize.
In 2005, at the request of Komarica, the Missionaries of Charity, opened their first monastery in Bosnia and Herzegovina. On 16 November 2005, Komarica founded the European Academy in Banja Luka. Two months later, on 6 February 2006, he established the Center for Life and Family of Caritas Bosnia and Herzegovina.

Awards
Pax Christi International Peace Award (1996)
Robert Schuman Medal (1997)
 Laureates of the Europe prize (2002)
Franz Werfel Human Rights Award (2005)
 Grand Cross of the Grand Order of King Dmitar Zvonimir (2007)
 Order of Honor (Republika Srpska) (2012)

See also
Roman Catholic Diocese of Banja Luka

References

External links

Official Biography of Bishop Komarica, biskupija-banjaluka.org; accessed 25 December 2015.

|-

1946 births
Living people
Croats of Bosnia and Herzegovina
Bishops of Banja Luka
20th-century Roman Catholic titular bishops
Bishops appointed by Pope John Paul II
Roman Catholic bishops in Yugoslavia
20th-century Roman Catholic bishops in Bosnia and Herzegovina
21st-century Roman Catholic bishops in Bosnia and Herzegovina